Natividad (Spanish for "Nativity") is an unincorporated community in Monterey County, California.

Natividad was named for the Rancho La Natividad Mexican land grant which included the community. A post office operated at Natividad from 1855 to 1908. Natividad was a bustling station for stage coaches in the 1850s until traffic was re-routed through Salinas.

References

Unincorporated communities in California
Unincorporated communities in Monterey County, California